Minnie and Moskowitz is a 1971 American romantic comedy-drama film written and directed by John Cassavetes and starring his wife Gena Rowlands and Seymour Cassel in the title roles of Minnie and Moskowitz, respectively.

Plot
Seymour Moskowitz is an eccentric and uncouth parking attendant who has just moved from New York to Los Angeles. Minnie Moore is a museum curator in an abusive relationship with a married man named Jim. Following their fight, she becomes disillusioned with love and meaningful relationships. Minnie talks with a friend about getting older and her chances of finding the right man.

The next day, Minnie is set up on a blind date with a bitter and loudmouthed widower, Zelmo. The date goes badly and ends with Zelmo chasing her out of the restaurant. Seymour, working the parking lot, witnesses the commotion and enters into a physical altercation with Zelmo. Seymour wins the fight, bloodying Zelmo's face, and Zelmo drives away crying, stranding Minnie. Seymour offers to give her a ride, which she refuses, but he pursues her in his truck and forces her inside. He drives her to her workplace, the Los Angeles County Museum of Art. Jim is waiting inside with his son and ends the relationship, revealing that his wife has attempted suicide. Infuriated and hurt, Minnie slaps Jim.

Seymour appears at Minnie's house to confront her about costing him his job at the parking lot. He takes her to a bar for a drink and then proclaims his love for her at a hot-dog stand. He berates her for taking herself too seriously when she does not return his affections. After leaving Minnie, Seymour brings a lady to his apartment who stays overnight.

Seymour takes Minnie to an ice-cream parlor and a country/western bar. In the parking lot, they dance to the music and kiss. When Minnie fails to introduce Seymour to her wealthy friends on the way into the bar, he angrily drives away and strands her, just as Zelmo had done. A wealthy male friend drives her home, where Seymour is waiting. The men fight, injuring Minnie in the process.

Seymour brings Minnie inside to recover, where she admits that she does not see a future with Seymour. Insisting that they are meant for each other, he threatens to kill himself and then cuts his long moustache in a frenzy. Minnie finally agrees to marry him and tells her mother about the news. Minnie and Seymour go to dinner with their mothers, who are hesitant and dubious about the marriage. Seymour's mother calls him a "bum" and tells Minnie that she could do much better than her son. Minnie's mother is overwhelmed and nearly speechless at the abruptness of the news and Seymour's appearance and personality.

Minnie and Seymour marry, laughing as the minister forgets his lines and fumbles for his notes. A flashforward shows a sunny backyard birthday party, possibly for their own child.

Cast
 Gena Rowlands as Minnie Moore
 Seymour Cassel as Seymour Moskowitz
 Val Avery as Zelmo Swift
 Timothy Carey as Morgan Morgan (as Tim Carey)
 Katherine Cassavetes as Sheba Moskowitz
 John Cassavetes as Jim (uncredited)
 David Rowlands as Minister
 Alexandra Cassavetes as Young girl in ballet tutu (uncredited)
 Zoe R. Cassavetes as Baby girl (uncredited)
 Lady Rowlands as Georgia Moore
 Holly Near as Irish
 Judith Roberts as Wife
 Kathleen O'Malley

Production
Minnie and Moskowitz is among a small number of low-budget (less than $1 million) films bankrolled by Universal Studios in the early 1970s in an attempt to copy the success of Easy Rider. Several months after the film's release, Universal Studios shortened the film's running time by excising a scene near the beginning of the film, but doing so violated the studio's contract with Cassavetes. All releases (including the DVD) since that time are missing this scene.

Reception
The film received generally positive reviews. In 1973, Cassavetes was nominated for a Writers Guild of America Award for Best Comedy Written Directly for the Screen.

In other media
The characters Big John and Little John spend Halloween night smoking marijuana and watching Minnie and Moskowitz in the 2021 horror film Halloween Kills.

See also
 List of American films of 1971

References

External links

1971 films
Films set in Los Angeles
Films directed by John Cassavetes
1970s English-language films
1971 drama films
Universal Pictures films
American independent films
American drama films
1971 independent films
1970s American films